Power star may refer to:
 Powerstar Golf, a video game developed by Zoë Mode
 Pawan Kalyan, a Telugu film actor popularly referred to as Power Star Pawan Kalyan
 Puneeth Rajkumar, a Kannada film actor popularly referred to as Power Star Puneeth Rajkumar
 Pawan Singh, a Bhojpuri film actor, Singer popularly referred to as Power Star Pawan Singh 
 Power Stars, features in the video game Super Mario 64
 Srinivasan (Tamil actor), a Tamil film actor known as Power Star Srinivasan

See also
 Star power (disambiguation)